Scolecoseps is a genus of skinks, lizards in the family Scincidae. The genus is endemic to East Africa.

Species
Genus Scolecoseps contains four species.

Scolecoseps acontias  – sandy limbless skink
Scolecoseps boulengeri  – Boulenger's limbless skink
Scolecoseps broadleyi  
Scolecoseps litipoensis  – Litipo sand skink

Nota bene: A binomial authority in parentheses indicates that the species was originally described in a genus other than Scolecoseps.

References

Further reading
Loveridge A (1920). "Notes on East African Lizards collected in 1915–1919, with Description of a new Genus and Species of Skink and new Subspecies of Gecko". Proceedings of the Zoological Society of London 1920: 131–167. (Scolecoseps, new genus, p. 159).

Scolecoseps
Lizard genera
Taxa named by Arthur Loveridge